The Dunhuang–Golmud railway or Dunge railway is a railway between Dunhuang, Gansu and Golmud, Qinghai in Northwestern China. The  railway from Dunhuang to Golmud consists of two parts: an existing section of the Qinghai–Tibet railway from Golmud to Yinmaxia station, and a newly built  single-track electrified rail line connecting Yinmaxia station to Dunhuang, following a route similar to that of China National Highway 215.

The construction of the line began in December 2012 and finished in December 2019. Since Dunhuang, located in the westernmost part of Gansu, is already connected to the Lanzhou–Xinjiang railway by the Liugou–Dunhuang branch (the Liudun railway), the Dunhuang–Golmud link establishes a direct connection between Xinjiang and Tibet Autonomous Region. Provisions is made for upgrading to double-track railway in the future.

Engineering challenges

Around Shashangou, between Dunhuang and the Altyn-Tagh–Qilian mountain system, the railway crosses the eastern edge of the Kumtag Desert. There was a concern that the  "megadunes" characteristic of this area may shift, burying the railway. However, geological research indicated that the "megadunes" are mostly formed by solid subsoil, rather than just sand. Although there is still the issue of drifting sand, it is thought by the experts that the sand is mostly blown along the direction of the future railway rather than across it, and can be handled with certain precautions.

The railway has 9 tunnels, with the total length of 32.62 km.

References 

Railway lines in China
Mountain railways
Rail transport in Gansu
Rail transport in Qinghai
Railway lines opened in 2019